Macaulay Gillesphey (born 24 November 1995) is an English professional footballer who plays as a defender for Plymouth Argyle.

Career

Newcastle United
Gillesphey played for Cramlington Juniors before being signed by Newcastle United where he progressed through the youth academy and signed a professional contract in March 2015. Gillesphey made his professional debut on 24 September 2015 in a 1–1 draw away at Liverpool in the League Cup.

Carlisle United (loan)
Gillesphey went out on loan to Carlisle United in September 2015 along with Newcastle teammate Alex Gilliead. On 29 July 2016, Gillesphey re-joined Carlisle United on loan until 2 January 2017, before later extending the deal to the end of the season.

Carlisle United
Gillesphey re-joined Carlisle United on a permanent basis in June 2018, signing a two-year contract with the club . On 22 May 2019, the club announced a mutual release so that Gillesphey could look for 'new challenges'.

Brisbane Roar
On 25 June 2019, the Brisbane Roar announced they had signed Gillesphey. He was the fourth signing made by new manager Robbie Fowler.

On 16 September 2020, Gillesphey was named the Gary Wilkins Medalist for the 2019–20 season.

On 15 June 2021, it was confirmed that Gillesphey had turned down the offer of a new contract at The Roar and would be returning to the UK to sign for a club in England.

Plymouth Argyle 
On 15 June 2021, Plymouth Argyle announced they had signed Gillesphey on a two-year deal after turning down a new contract with Brisbane Roar. He was given additional time off before pre-season due to the late finish of the A-League season.

Gillesphey scored his first goal for Argyle on 5 February 2022 against Chelsea in the fourth round of the FA Cup at Stamford Bridge. The goal gave Argyle an early lead against the reigning European champions in a match they eventually went on lose 2–1 after extra time.

Career statistics

Honours 
Individual
 Gary Wilkins Medal (Brisbane Roar Player Of The Year): 2019–20

References

External links

1995 births
Living people
English footballers
Association football defenders
A-League Men players
English Football League players
Newcastle United F.C. players
Carlisle United F.C. players
Brisbane Roar FC players
Plymouth Argyle F.C. players